The State Examinations Commission is the organisation that replaced the Examinations Branch of the Department of Education in Ireland.

History
The State Examinations Commission is a State body established by statutory order on 6 March 2003. The Commission assumed responsibility for the operation of the State Certificate Examinations from the Department of Education.

The State Examinations Commission has an online system which allows examination candidates to view their results on its website.

Organisation
The commission is staffed by civil servants and there are five Commissioners appointed by the Minister for Education.

Functions
The commission oversees the state examinations at secondary education level in Ireland. Its offices are located in Athlone, County Westmeath. The two examinations the commission oversees for accreditation and certification are:

 Junior Cycle
 Leaving Certificate

Typically about 60,000 students present for each of these examinations each year, generally commencing on the first Wednesday of June. The commission holds the results of public examinations carried out by the Intermediate Education Board for Ireland (1879-1924), these include the Junior Grade, Middle Grade and Senior Grade. A list of the  department's former examinations include:

See also
 Education in the Republic of Ireland

References

External links
 State Examinations Commission

Department of Education (Ireland)
Educational organisations based in Ireland
Secondary education in Ireland
Athlone